Our Lady Of Mercy Catholic High School (OLMCHS) is a Catholic school located in the Kolonia, Pohnpei Island, Pohnpei State, Federated States of Micronesia. OLMCHS is an academic high school. It is being staffed by the Spanish Mercederian Sisters and volunteers from the United States of America and Latin America.

See also
 Education in the Federated States of Micronesia

References

External links
 Our Lady of Mercy Catholic High School

Educational institutions with year of establishment missing
Pohnpei
Catholic secondary schools in Oceania
Schools in the Federated States of Micronesia